Rebecca Claire Hill (born 14 February 1994), known professionally as Becky Hill, is an English singer and songwriter. She rose to prominence after appearing on the first series of the then BBC (now ITV) talent contest The Voice UK, auditioning with John Legend's "Ordinary People". She joined Jessie J's team and reached the semi-final of the competition. On 29 June 2014 she became the first (and only thus far) The Voice UK contestant to score a UK number 1 when the song, "Gecko (Overdrive)" with Oliver Heldens topped the UK Singles Chart. In 2022, she received two Brit Awards nominations, including British Song of the Year for "Remember" with David Guetta, and Best Dance Act, which she won 2 years in a row in 2022 and 2023.

Early and personal life 
Becky Hill was born on 14 February 1994. She began making music at the age of 14 and started performing in a band called Shaking Trees – receiving BBC Introducing support from Andrew Marston at BBC Hereford & Worcester who selected her band to perform at the Nozstock Festival of Performing Arts, as well as a live session for Adam Green and Josh Withey at BBC Radio Shropshire. Hill is a supporter of Walsall F.C. In April 2021, she came out as queer on her Twitter account, stating "I've definitely felt uncomfortable branding myself as straight, or anything else for that matter, but queer seems to be the most fitting identity for who I am". On 11 January 2022, Hill announced her engagement via social media to her long-term boyfriend, Charlie Gardner.

Career

2012: The Voice 

Hill has appeared in a number of live performances for YouTube, including a web series called The Rebelations. She auditioned for the first series of The Voice UK, and at the blind auditions she performed "Ordinary People". Judges Jessie J and will.i.am, the only coaches with an available space on their teams, turned around for her. She opted to join Jessie. In the battle rounds she competed against Indie and Pixie performing the song "Irreplaceable", she won the battle and progressed to the live shows. She got to the semi-final stage of the competition where she was eliminated.

2013–2017: Breakthrough and Eko EP 
Since appearing on The Voice UK, versions of David Guetta's "She Wolf" and "Not Giving In" by Rudimental have been published, as have covers of Paolo Nutini's "Last Request" and Alex Clare's "Too Close". Hill featured on Rudimental's track "Powerless", taken from their debut album Home. She also provided cover for Ella Eyre's vocals for Rudimental's set at Glastonbury 2013, Bestival 2013, Wakestock 2013 and Lovebox 2013. Hill provided vocals for and co-wrote Wilkinson's song Afterglow, which peaked at number 8 on the UK Singles Chart in October 2013, the song also peaked at number 1 on the UK Dance Chart. "Powerless" received a full single release on 23 February 2014. The song peaked at number 73 on the UK Singles Chart. Hill appeared on and co-wrote a vocal version of Oliver Heldens' "Gecko", renamed "Gecko (Overdrive)", alongside MNEK. The song topped the UK Singles Chart on 29 June 2014 thus making her the first The Voice UK contestant to achieve a number 1.

On 9 November 2014 she released a single, "Losing", which was produced by MNEK and intended to be the lead single from her solo album with then label Parlophone Records. The single debuted at number 56 on the UK Singles Chart. Hill co-wrote Australian recording artist Reigan Derry's debut single "All of the Pieces". In July 2015, French house producer Watermät released a vocal version of his track "Frequency" with Hill as joint lead artist. The track was renamed to "All My Love".

In early 2016, Hill announced that she was songwriting with CocknBullKid. In May 2016 she released her first proper single in two years, entitled "Back to My Love", featuring vocals from rapper Little Simz. It was said to be the lead single off of her debut album, but was later included in the Eko EP, released in August 2017. During the summer, she collaborated with a number of artists. Her first was with DJ and record producer MK on his single "Piece of Me". The second was with Matoma on his breakthrough single "False Alarm". In the late months of 2016, she announced a second single from her EP, entitled "Warm". It was co-written with MNEK and produced by Shift K3Y. In the end of March 2017, she released a third single, entitled "Rude Love". The song was co-written and produced by MNEK. The music video was released in April alongside the launch of her official VEVO channel on YouTube.

In May 2017, Hill signed a worldwide publishing deal with Sony/ATV and also guest presented an episode of CBBC's The Playlist. Following from this, Hill released a fourth single "Unpredictable" from the Eko EP, along with the EP itself in August 2017 as the final release from her own independent label Eko Music Limited. "Unpredictable"  was co-written by Karen Poole and MNEK, who also produced the track.

2017–2019: Get to Know 
Hill announced in August 2017 that she had signed a worldwide record deal with Polydor Records and expected to release her debut album in 2019. Upon signing her record deal, manager Alex Martin was quoted saying "Becky is at an incredibly exciting stage in her career. The public have only seen a small amount of Becky as a solo artist and what she can do and we were looking for the right partner to work with to take that further".

In 2018, she released the single "Sunrise in the East", which was treated as the lead cut from her supposedly rejuvenated debut project. Not long after, she appeared on songs including "Back & Forth", alongside Marc Kinchen and Jonas Blue. This continued in the following year with "I Could Get Used to This", with Weiss, and finally "Wish You Well", with Sigala, which became her first top 10 hit in the UK Charts since "Gecko (Overdrive)". She also wrote the song "All Day and Night" by Jax Jones, Martin Solveig and Madison Beer, which was her first written effort to make it to the top 10 in the UK Charts. On 6 July 2019, Hill performed at Pride in London on the Trafalgar Square stage.

On 24 September 2019, Hill announced on social media that she was going to be releasing a "mini-album" that Friday, with four new tracks. These four tracks were previously planned on being released on their own as an extended play, entitled Fickle Emotions, but the idea was scrapped before including them on a compilation album. The album, under the title Get to Know, was released on 27 September 2019.

On 6 December 2019, Hill released a cover of the Yazoo song, "Only You", dedicated to her grandfather, who had introduced her to The Flying Pickets' cover version of the song when she was young.

2020–2022: Only Honest on the Weekend 
At the beginning of 2020, Hill supported Irish pop rock band The Script on their Sunsets & Full Moons tour in the UK and Ireland and performed some of her songs from Get to Know. In late March of that year, the rest of the dates were cancelled due to the COVID-19 pandemic.

She released the next singles from her debut album Only Honest on the Weekend; "Better Off Without You" with Shift K3Y and "Heaven on My Mind" with Sigala, both of which reached number fourteen on the UK Singles Chart. Follow up single "Space" peaked at seventy-nine, though this later did not make the final tracklist.

In April, she collaborated with Tiesto on the song "Nothing Really Matters" which was later released through Tiesto's seventh album The London Sessions, where she featured on another song called "Over You". In June, she premiered a Spotify podcast called "The Art of Rave" with features such as Pete Tong, Sister Bliss and DJ Zinc.

In November, she covered Alphaville's "Forever Young" for the UK's McDonald's Christmas advert. The track became her first song without a joint credit to reach the UK Top 40, when it peaked at number thirty-five.

Beginning in 2021, Hill released the singles "Last Time" and "Remember" with French DJ David Guetta. They peaked at number thirty-nine and number three respectively, the latter becoming Hill's fourth top-ten hit.

On 15 July 2021, Hill teased the release of her debut album, Only Honest on the Weekend, with a trailer on her Instagram featuring previously unreleased songs "My Heart Goes (La Di Da)" with Topic and "Through the Night" with 220 Kid. The tracklist was later confirmed in full by Official Charts. The album was originally planned to be released on 20 August 2021. Hill explained that the album would be delayed 1 week, and released on 27 August 2021 to let "My Heart Goes (La Di Da)" shine on the UK charts. Released as the final single from the album, the song spent four weeks at number 11 becoming Hill's ninth top-20 single.

Additionally, on 25 August 2021, days before the release of Only Honest on the Weekend, a "Kiss My (Uh Oh)" Girl Power Remix was released that Hill featured on along with Anne-Marie, Little Mix, Raye and Stefflon Don.

On 25 January 2022, Hill announced that she will release a song with Wilkinson 9 years after their previous hit "Afterglow". The song is called "Here For You" and it was released on 11 February 2022. She later released "Run", a collaboration with Swedish EDM duo Galantis was released on 25 February 2022. This was followed by a deluxe edition of her debut album Only Honest on the Weekend. It included singles "Space", "Run" with Galantis, "Hold On" with Netsky and "Here For You" with Wilkinson, the song "Personally" and the acoustic version of "Remember".

On 8 April 2022, Hill collaborated with David Guetta and Ella Henderson on the song "Crazy What Love Can Do". In July 2022, she performed at the closing ceremony of UEFA Women's Euro 2022 at Wembley Stadium, after which she was trolled online due to the silver leotard she wore for the performance. She also performed during the beach volleyball events at the 2022 Commonwealth Games in Birmingham.

On 5 August 2022, Hill collaborated with British DJ Joel Corry on the song "History".

Discography 

Studio albums
 Only Honest on the Weekend (2021)

Compilation albums
 Get to Know (2019)

Tour

Headlining 
Becky Hill Tour 2021 (2021-2022)

Awards and nominations

References 

1994 births
Living people
English dance musicians
English women singer-songwriters
English women pop singers
Queer women
English LGBT songwriters
English LGBT singers
Queer songwriters
Queer singers
Parlophone artists
Brit Award winners
People from Bewdley
The Voice UK contestants
21st-century English women singers
21st-century LGBT people